Axel Wemmenborn (born 28 April 1992) is a Swedish professional ice hockey forward, currently playing for AIK IF in the HockeyAllsvenskan (Allsv).

He has previously played with Malmö Redhawks of the Swedish Hockey League (SHL). Wemmenborn was born in Kristianstad, a city in Sweden. His youth team is Kristianstads IK.

References

External links

1992 births
Living people
AIK IF players
Leksands IF players
Malmö Redhawks players
Modo Hockey players
Sportspeople from Malmö
Swedish ice hockey goaltenders
Växjö Lakers players
21st-century Swedish people